Charles Tuttle may refer to:
 Charles A. Tuttle, economist, the author of "The Wealth Concept. A Study in Economic Theory" 

 Charles Wesley Tuttle (1829–1881), American astronomer
 Charles Tuttle (fl. 1883), baseball player, see 1883 Brooklyn Grays season
 Charles H. Tuttle (1879–1971), lawyer, U.S. Attorney for the Southern District of New York
 Charles E. Tuttle (1915–1993), publisher